was a district located in Yamaguchi Prefecture, Japan.

As of 2003, the district had an estimated population of 18,761. The total area was 205.49 km2.

Until March 21, 2005, the district had three towns.
 Heki
 Misumi
 Yuya

On March 22, 2005, the towns of Heki, Misumi and Yuya were merged into the expanded city of Nagato. Ōtsu District was dissolved as a result of this merger.

History

Timeline
1889 - Due to the municipal status enforcement, the villages of Senzakitōri, Fukagawa, Misumi, Tawarayama, 菱海, Utsuga, Mutsugu and Heki. (8 villages)
April 1, 1899 - A part of the village of Senzakitōri was renamed to become the village of Tōri; and the remaining part of Senzakitōri was renamed to become the village of Senzaki. (9 villages)  
April 15, 1914 - The village of Senzaki was elevated to town status. (1 town, 8 villages)
November 1, 1928 - The village of Fukagawa was elevated to town status. (2 towns, 7 villages)
November 3, 1942 - The village of Misumi was elevated to town status. (3 towns, 6 villages)
March 31, 1954 - The towns of Senzaki and Fukagawa, and the villages of Tōri and Tawarayama were merged to create the city of Nagato. (1 town, 4 villages)
May 1, 1954 - The villages of 菱海村, Utsuga, Mutsugu and a part of Heki were merged to create the town of Yuya. (2 towns, 1 village)
April 1, 1978 - The village of Heki (remaining parts) was elevated to town status. (3 towns)
March 22, 2005 - The towns of Heki, Misumi and Yuya were merged into the expanded city of Nagato. Ōtsu District was dissolved as a result of this merger.

See also
List of dissolved districts of Japan

Former districts of Yamaguchi Prefecture